The Bacilli-1 RNA motif is a conserved RNA structure that was discovered by bioinformatics.
Bacilli-1 motifs are found in Bacilli.
Bacilli-1 RNAs likely function in trans as sRNAs.

The previously published F3 sRNA often occurs nearby to Bacilli-1 RNAs.  Therefore, it is possible that these distinct sRNA structures function together or have a related biological function.

References

Non-coding RNA